Philadelphus coronarius (sweet mock orange, English dogwood) is a species of flowering plant in the family Hydrangeaceae, native to Southern Europe.

Description
In the species the blooms are abundant and very fragrant, but less so in the cultivars. It may resemble, but is not closely related to, varieties of the similarly named dogwood, which is the common name for Cornus in the family Cornaceae.

The specific epithet coronarius means "used for garlands".

Cultivation
It is a popular ornamental plant for gardens in temperate regions, valued for its profuse sweetly scented white blossom in early summer. There are a large number of named cultivars.  The following cultivars have gained the Royal Horticultural Society's Award of Garden Merit:-
 P. coronarius 'Aureus'
P. coronarius 'Variegatus'

Gallery

See also
Philadelphus × lemoinei (an hybrid obtained crossing P. coronarius and P. microphyllus)

References

External links
 
 
 

Flora of Europe
Garden plants of Europe
coronarius
Shrubs
Plants described in 1753
Taxa named by Carl Linnaeus